Milo Lompar (born 19 April 1962) is a Serbian literary historian, professor at the Faculty of Philology, University of Belgrade, writer, president of the Miloš Crnjanski Endowment and former director general of Politika.

Biography 
Lompar was born in 1962 in Belgrade which at that time was part of the Socialist Federal Republic of Yugoslavia and is of paternal Montenegrin Serb descent. He graduated from the Faculty of Philology in Belgrade (Group for Yugoslav Literature and General Literature). He received his doctorate at the same faculty with a thesis on the historical, poetic and literary heritage of the 18th and 19th centuries in the late works of Miloš Crnjanski before a commission consisting of academician Nikola Milošević, prof. dr. Jovan Deretić and prof. dr. Novica Petković. At the Faculty of Philology in Belgrade, he is a professor of Serbian literature of the 18th and 19th centuries and Cultural history of Serbs. He was the general director of Politika a.d. in the period 2005–2006.

Political involvement 
As a non-partisan member of the Dveri Political Council, which he joined in 2015 along with Kosta Čavoški, Aleksandar Lipkovski, Vladimir Dimitrijević, Zoran Čvorović and other national conservative oriented intellectuals, he helped the Dveri and Democratic Party of Serbia political coalition win its MPs in the 2016 parliamentary elections. He left the Dveri Political Council in January 2018.

In April 2022, Lompar signed a petition calling for Serbia not to impose sanctions on Russia after it invaded Ukraine.

Bibliography

Published essays and studies 

 Historical, Poetic and Literary Heritage of the 18th and 19th centuries in the Late Works of Miloš Crnjanski, doctoral dissertation, 1993.
 About the end of the novel (The meaning of the end of the novel The Second Book of Migration by Miloš Crnjanski, Rad, Beograd, 1995. Drugo, izmenjeno izdanje: Drustvo za srpski jezik i književnost Srbije, Beograd, 2008.
 Modern Times in the Prose of Dragiša Vasić, Filip Višnjić, Belgrade, 1996.
 Njegoš and the Modern, Filip Višnjić, Belgrade, 1998. Second, corrected edition, Nolit, Belgrade, 2008
 Crnjanski and Mephistopheles (On the Hidden Figure of the Novel about London), Filip Visnjic, Belgrade, 2000. Second, edited edition, Nolit, Belgrade, 2007.
 Apollo's Signposts (Essays on Crnjanski), Official Gazette of Serbia and Montenegro, Belgrade, 2004.
 Book on Crnjanski, Serbian Literary Association, Belgrade, 2005.
 Serbian literature of the 18th and 19th centuries, Narodna knjiga, Belgrade, 2006 - With co-author Zorica Nestorović
 Moralistic Fragments, Narodna knjiga, Belgrade, 2007. Second, expanded edition, Nolit, Belgrade, 2009.
 Somewhere on the Border of Philosophy and Literature (On the literary hermeneutics of Nikola Milošević), Službeni glasnik, Belgrade, 2009.
 About the Tragic Poet (Njegoš's songs), Albatross plus, Belgrade, 2010.
 Njegoš's Poetry, Serbian Literary Association, Belgrade, 2010.
 The Spirit of Self-Denial, a contribution to the critique of Serbian culture, Orpheus, Novi Sad, 2011.
 Return to the Serbian Point of View, Catena Mundi, Belgrade, 2013.
 Polyhistorical Research, Catena Mundi, Belgrade, 2016.
 Praise for Modernity, Laguna, Belgrade, 2016.
 Freedom and Truth, Catena Mundi, Belgrade, 2018.
 Crnjanski: Biography of One Feeling, Poslovna reč NS, Belgrade, 2018.
Pseudo-Intellectual and National Politics, Catena Mundi, Belgrade, 2021

In 2018, the Serbian Literary Guild published a book of texts about the painter Petar Lubarda, titled Knjiga o Lubardi. The selection of texts was made by Professor Milo Lompar.

References 

1962 births
People from Belgrade
Serbs of Montenegro
Serbian people of Montenegrin descent
20th-century Serbian historians
21st-century Serbian historians
Serbian literary historians
University of Belgrade Faculty of Philology alumni
Living people